Chicano English, or Mexican-American English, is a dialect of American English spoken primarily by Mexican Americans (sometimes known as Chicanos), particularly in the Southwestern United States ranging from Texas to California, as well as in Chicago. Chicano English is sometimes mistakenly conflated with Spanglish, which is a mixing of Spanish and English; however, Chicano English is a fully formed and native dialect of English, not a "learner English" or interlanguage. It is even the native dialect of some speakers who know little to no Spanish, or have no Mexican heritage.

Naming issues 
Many people who speak Chicano English do not themselves identify with the term "Chicano." For example, none of 's eight Hispanic participants identified with the term. Despite this, Chicano English remains the most widely used and recognized term for this language variety. Some studies on Chicano English have used terms such as "Mexican-American English", "Latino English", and "Mexican Heritage English".

History
Communities of Spanish-speaking Tejanos, Nuevomexicanos, Californios, and Mission Indians have existed in the American Southwest since the area was part of New Spain's Provincias Internas. Most of the historically Hispanophone populations eventually adopted English as their first language, as part of their overall Americanization.

A high level of Mexican immigration began in the 20th century, with the exodus of refugees from the Mexican Revolution (1910) and the linkage of Mexican railroads to the US (Santa Ana, 1991). The Hispanic population is one of the largest and fastest-growing ethnic groups in the United States. In the Los Angeles metropolitan area alone, they form 45% of the population (roughly 6 million out of 13.3 million in 2014). The result of the migration and the segregated social conditions of the immigrants in California made an ethnic community that is only partly assimilated to the matrix Anglo (European American) community. It retains symbolic links with Hispanic culture (as well as real links from continuing immigration), but linguistically, it is mostly an English-speaking, not a Spanish-speaking, community. However, its members have a distinctive accent.

The phonological inventory of Chicano English speakers appears to be identical to that of the local Anglo community. For example, long and short vowels are clearly distinguished, as is the English vowel . Speculatively, it seems that the main differences between the Chicano accent and the local Anglo accent are that the Chicanos are not always participating in ongoing phonetic changes in Anglo communities, such as the raising of  that characterizes Anglo Inland Northern speakers but not necessarily Hispanic ones.

Because Spanish-speaking people migrated from other parts of the Hispanophone world to the Southwest, Chicano English is now the customary dialect of many Hispanic Americans of diverse national heritages in the Southwest. As Hispanics are of diverse racial origins, Chicano English serves as the distinction from non-Hispanic and non-Latino Americans in the Southwest.

A common stereotype about Chicano English speakers, similar to stereotypes about other racial/ethnic minorities in the United States, is that Chicano English speakers are not proficient in English and are generally uneducated. This language ideology is linked to negative perceptions about Chicano Americans and Hispanics in general. Some of these stereotypes can be seen in popular films that depict the Chicano lifestyles and dialects. Most of these films take place in Southern California. Some of the more popular films, where this can be noted, are Mi Familia, American Me and Blood In Blood Out. These films are an example of the Southern California Chicano dialect and also of some of the stereotypes that are thought of when one thinks of Chicanos.

Phonology

Prosody
The rhythm of Chicano English tends to have an intermediate prosody between a Spanish-like syllable timing, with syllables taking up roughly the same amount of time with roughly the same amount of stress, and General American English's stress timing, with only stressed syllables being evenly timed. 

Chicano English also has a complex set of nonstandard English intonation patterns, such as pitch rises on significant words in the middle and at the end of sentences as well as initial-sentence high pitches, which are often accompanied by the lengthening of the affected syllables. When needing extra emphasis to certain words, there is the use of rising glides. Rising glides can be used multiple times in one sentence. On compound nouns and verbs, major stress is on the second word.  Rising glides can occur at any time and at either monosyllabic or polysyllabic words.

Consonants

Certain Chicano English consonant pronunciations are similar to African-American Vernacular English. 
Chicano English often exhibits th-stopping. That  is, the "th" sound may be replaced by more of a "d" sound, as in "dese" and "dem" instead of "these" and "them". 
t/d deletion occurs at the end of a word when those consonants are part of a consonant cluster. For example, "missed" becomes "miss".
Certain consonants show Spanish-language influence:
 is never velarized and so it is pronounced similarly to Spanish , which also lacks velarization, in all positions.

Vowels
Mexican-Americans show variable participation in local sound shifts, like the Northern Cities Shift of the Great Lakes or the California Shift in the American West.

Reduction of unstressed vowels is less common in Chicano English than in Anglo varieties.

While a lack of pre-nasal /æ/ raising is often characteristic of Chicano English, in El Paso, /æ/ raising is found among both Anglos and Hispanics. 

This is found in Los Angeles, northern New Mexico and Albuquerque, and in El Paso.

This feature has since spread to other varieties of California English.

That is also a feature of general California English.

 is slightly fronted, as in most American and many British dialects, but they are less fronted than in mainstream California English.

That may be an effect of Spanish, but other American English dialects (Minnesota, and Wisconsin, for example) also show monophthongization of such vowels, which are more commonly diphthongs in English.

Variation
A fair to strong degree of variation exists in the phonology of Chicano English. Its precise boundaries are difficult to delineate, perhaps because of its separate origins of the dialect in the Southwest and the Midwest.

One subvariety, referenced as Tejano English, is used mainly in southern Texas. California subvarieties are also widely studied, especially that of the Los Angeles metropolitan area, such as East Los Angeles Chicano English, which includes elements of African American Vernacular English and California English.

New Mexico
One type of Hispanic English, a sub-type under Chicano English of the American West, is specific to north-central New Mexico. A recent study found that native English–Spanish bilinguals in New Mexico have a lower/shorter/weaker voice-onset time than that typical of native monolingual English speakers.

East Los Angeles
This form of Chicano English is predominantly spoken in East Los Angeles and has been influenced by the California English of coastal European-Americans and African-American Vernacular English.

Notable native speakers

Gloria Anzaldúa — "I spoke English like a Mexican. At Pan American University, I and all Chicano students were required to take two speech classes. Their purpose: to get rid of our accents."
César Chávez — "His speech was soft, sweetened by a Spanish accent"
George Lopez — "Chicanos are their own breed. Even though we're born in the United States, we still have accents."
Cheech Marin — "a hint of a Chicano accent" — "a Spanish accent or stereotypical East Los Angeles cadence like Cheech Marin"

See also

 Caló (Chicano)
 New York Latino English

References

Sources

 
Briggs, Charles L. Competence in Performance: The Creativity of Tradition in Mexicano Verbal Art. University of Pennsylvania Press conduct and communication series. Philadelphia: University of Pennsylvania Press, (1988).
 
 Castaneda, L. V. and Ulanoff, S. H. (2007). Examining Chicano English at school. In C. Gitsaki (Ed.). Language and Languages: Global and Local Tensions, (pp. 328–345). Newcastle, UK: Cambridge Scholars Publishing.
 Fought, Carmen. (2003). Chicano English in context. New York: Palgrave Macmillan.
 Galindo, Letticia D. (1987). Linguistic influence and variation of the English of Chicano adolescents in Austin, Texas. (PhD dissertation, University of Texas at Austin).
 Liu, Jennifer Anchor dissects American English Stanford Daily, February 23, 2005
 Maddieson, Ian, and Manuel Godinez Jr. "Vowel differences between Chicano and General Californian English." International Journal of the Sociology of Language 1985, no. 53 (May 1985): 43-58. Communication & Mass Media Complete, EBSCOhost (accessed October 15, 2015).
 Ornstein-Galicia, J. (1988). Form and Function in Chicano English. Rowley, Mass.: Newbury House Publishers.
 Penfield, Joyce. Chicano English: An Ethnic Contact Dialect. Varieties of English around the world, General series; v. 7. Amsterdam; Philadelphia: J. Benjamins Pub. Co., (1985).
 Sanchez, Rosaura. Chicano Discourse: Sociohistoric Perspectives. Rowley, Mass.: Newbury House Publishers, (1983).
 Santa Ana, Otto. (1993). Chicano English and the Chicano language setting. Hispanic Journal of Behavioral Sciences, 15 (1), 1-35.
 
 Veatch, Thomas Los Angeles Chicano English (2005)
 Wolfram, Walt. (1974). Sociolinguistic aspects of assimilation: Puerto Rican English in New York City. Washington, D.C.: Center for Applied Linguistics.
 A Handbook of Varieties of English
Guerrero, Armando. “'You Speak Good English for Being Mexican' East Los Angeles Chicano/a English: Language & Identity.” Voices, 4 June 2014, escholarship.org/uc/item/94v4c08k.
Santa Ana, Otto. “Chicano English and the Nature of the Chicano Language Setting.” Hispanic Journal of Behavioral Sciences, 1 Feb. 1993, journals.sagepub.com/doi/abs/10.1177/07399863930151001.

External links
"Spanish & Chicano English." Do You Speak American?
 Hector Becerra, "East L.A. speaks from its heart", Los Angeles Times October 24, 2011
 La Coacha

American English
Chicano
Mexican-American culture in California
Mexican-American culture in Arizona
Mexican-American culture in New Mexico
Mexican-American culture in Texas
Languages of California
Languages of Texas